Vitrolles is a commune in the Bouches-du-Rhône département in the Provence-Alpes-Côte d'Azur region in southern France, located about 20.6 km (12.8 mi) from Marseille. It is the largest suburb of the city of Aix-en-Provence and is adjacent to its southwest side.

Population

Twin towns – sister cities

Vitrolles is twinned with:
 Mörfelden-Walldorf, Germany

Administration
List of mayors of Vitrolles:

1800–1808: Paul Gueidon
1808–1812: Pierre Joseph Gabriel Bertrand
1813–1817: Louis Barrigue de Monvalon
1817–1823: Jacques Pierre Hilarion Audibert
1824–1830: Louis Martin
1830–1831: Honoré-Etienne Emery
1831–1837: Hyppolite Baret
1837–1842: André Guilhen
1842–1844: Joseph Constant
1844–1846: Barthélemy Bontoux
1847–1848: Jean-Etienne Bonsignour
1848–1848: Casimir Berard
1848–1850: Jean-Joseph Audibert
1850–1850: Louis Faren
1850–1863: Honoré Lataud
1863–1865: Jean-Pierre Christophe
1865–1867: Jules Aimard
1867–1870: Jean Antoine Audibert
1870–1874: François Hilaire Touche
1874–1878: Lucien Sauvat
1878–1892: François Hilaire Touche
1892–1908: Vital Rouard
1908–1912: Pierre Gustave Constant
1912–1925: Cyprien Touche
1825–1944: Jules Guibaud
1944–1954: Henri Loubet
1954–1966: Victor Martin
1966–1977: Henri Bremond
1977–1983: Pierre Scelles
1983–1997: Jean-Jacques Anglade
1997–2002: Catherine Mégret
2002–2009: Guy Obino

See also
 Charlie Jazz Festival
 Communes of the Bouches-du-Rhône department
 Étang de Berre

References

External links

 Official website

Communes of Bouches-du-Rhône
Bouches-du-Rhône communes articles needing translation from French Wikipedia